In comics, decompression is a stylistic storytelling choice characterized by a strong emphasis on visuals or character interaction, which, in turn, usually leads to slower-moving plots.

The style is often used with widescreen comics.

History
Decompression developed a strong presence in mainstream American comic books in the 1990s and 2000s. Traditionally, American comics first appeared as anthologies featuring multiple short stories per issue, usually with different characters, which continued for decades in the back-up story pages. The done-in-one format prevailed for a long time eventually becoming seconded by open ended multiple-subplots that characterized the '70s and '80s in American comics.

Decompression is often claimed to be a result of the growing influence of manga on the international comics scene. Manga, traditionally less expensive per page than American comics due to higher circulation and black and white printing, extensively uses decompression as a storytelling style. This style of storytelling which was influenced by film storyboarding was first popularized in manga by cartoonist Osamu Tezuka with his 1947 manga Shin Takarajima (New Treasure Island). Tezuka's more "cinematic style" was so successful that it caught on with other cartoonists in Japan and eventually spread throughout the world with works such as Katsuhiro Otomo's epic Akira which was one of the first manga to become popular within the American comicbook community.

A manga that uses this style successfully (and one of the first ones in the latest years) is Blame!, thought to have influenced American artists.

One of the first commercially successful American comics to use decompression as its dominant style was the first twelve issues of The Authority by Warren Ellis and Bryan Hitch. In the wake of that book's success, decompression was widely adopted across the American comics industry with varying degrees of success.

Many alternative American cartoonists make use of decompression, most notably those who are directly influenced by manga, like Bryan Lee O'Malley.

Some French comic books use decompression as a storytelling technique. Most notable are artists associated with the Franco-Japanese La nouvelle manga movement such as Frédéric Boilet (Yukiko's Spinach) and Vanyada (The Building Opposite).

Dave McKean's Cages is an example of the usage of decompression, with its extensive use of this style. Cages' storyline spans more than 500 pages but focuses on a relatively short stretch of time.

Criticism
Decompressed stories have been the cause of considerable controversy and debate amongst the comics fandom. Many detractors accuse their writers of unnecessarily stretching out the page length of plots, thinning out the content per page in order to earn more sales and money for a limited amount of work. Defenders of the style claim that decompressed stories are not stretched out, but rich in character development and mood rather than plot progression. Some see the phenomenon as driven by the increasing popularity of trade paperbacks, which typically collect an average of six comic book issues in a volume and thus provide a target length for stories to fit.

Compression
In response to criticism of the widespread use of decompression in mainstream American comics, writers Warren Ellis, Dan Slott, and Brian Wood have each experimented with compressed storytelling. Ellis' series Fell, Global Frequency, and Planetary each adhere to the format of single issue stories, and Nextwave is told only in two issue arcs. Slott's stories in She-Hulk and Thing also maintain only one, two, or three issue story arcs, and his contribution to the 2005 edition of Amazing Fantasy #15 uses what he referred to as "hypercompressed" storytelling: 6 writers were given 8 pages each to premiere a new character, and Slott elected to tell four stories with his character, each one a mere two pages. Brian Wood's indie series Demo and Local are all single-issue comics, in some cases with no recurring characters from one issue to the next, creating a true self-contained short story experience.

References

 Schodt, Frederik L. Manga! Manga!: The World of Japanese Comics. New York: Kodansha International, 1983. ,

External links
 A Thousand Flowers: Compression, Decompression by Stuart Moore. Retrieved Jan 10th, 2014. Original . 
 Decompression Chamber
 Boilet's discussion on Nouvelle Manga - information on manga influence in the Franco-Belgian comics market
 Keith Giffen: As if I Care…. Retrieved Jan 10th, 2014. Original .

Comics terminology